Koronadal, officially the City of Koronadal (Maguindanaon: Kuta nu Koronadal, Jawi: كوتا نو كورونادال), also known as Marbel, is a 3rd class component city and capital of the province of South Cotabato, Philippines. According to the 2020 census, it has a population of 195,398 people.

It is the capital of the province of South Cotabato and regional administrative center of Soccsksargen (Region XII).

Koronadal City is one of the Planned Cities of the Philippines that were signed by Congress on 1965. It became a component city of South Cotabato by virtue of Republic Act 8803 dated October 8, 2000.

Koronadal City is one of the two cities in Mindanao where majority of the citizens are ethnic Hiligaynons, who comprise 95% of the city's population, the other being Tacurong City, Sultan Kudarat. In 2003 and 2005 the city was recognized as "Most Competitive City" in the small-city category, and in 2005 and 2006 as the most business friendly city in Mindanao.

History

The settlement of Koronadal and its creation as a municipality by virtue of Executive Order No. #82 dated August 18, 1947, was marked by a rapid initial development, so that when the province of South Cotabato was created under Republic Act No. 4849 on July 18, 1966, it easily became the capital town. In the past, the place was populated by Blaan people and Maguindanaons. The word Koronadal is believed to have been derived from two Blaan words- kalon meaning cogon grass, and nadal or datal meaning plain, which aptly described the place to the natives. On the other hand, Marbel, which is another name for the poblacion, is a Blaan term marb el which means "murky waters" referring to a river, now called the Marbel River.

Koronadal City used to comprise the area extending from the banks of Buluan Lake to the north to Barangay Polonoling in the municipality of Tupi, South Cotabato to the south from Quezon mountain range to the northeast to the municipality of T'boli, South Cotabato to the southeast.

It was on August 18, 1947, when President Manuel Roxas signed the Executive Order creating the municipalities in the entire province of Cotabato, one of which was Marbel (now Koronadal). The same executive order likewise mandated the official function of the municipal government which began after the qualification and election of the first set of municipal officials.

The municipal government of Koronadal began its official function on January 1, 1948, with an approved Annual Estimated Budget of P30,000.00. The land area of the municipality by then was comparable with the Province of Bata-an embracing the present municipalities of Tampakan, Tupi, Banga, Lake Sebu, Surallah, T'boli, South Cotabato, Santo Niño, Norala, and Isulan.

Municipal Council Resolution No. 32, Series of 1948 mandated and proclaimed January 10 of each year as the Municipal Town Fiesta commemorating the foundation of Marbel Settlement District of the National Land Settlement.

Cityhood

Koronadal was converted into a component city of South Cotabato by virtue of Republic Act No. 8803 on October 8, 2000. At present, Koronadal City is a fast-developing growth center composed of twenty-seven barangays including the four zones in the poblacion. Being the capital city of South Cotabato, it is the center of the province in terms of political, cultural and socio-economic activities.

By virtue of Executive Order No. 304 signed by then President Gloria Macapagal Arroyo, Koronadal City was named as the Regional political and socio-economic center of Soccsksargen on March 30, 2004. Regional departments, bureaus and offices were ordered to move from Cotabato City, the former Regional Center of the Region.

Geography
Koronadal is located in the central part of southern Mindanao, in a gently sloping plain surrounded by low mountains.

Barangays

Koronadal City is politically subdivided into 27 barangays with 4 zones in the poblacion area. 8 of which are on the urban area while the remaining 19 are located on the rural area.

Climate

The climate of Koronadal is mild and sub-tropical, belonging to climate Type IV. The place is typhoon free. Rainy months are from June to October.

Demographics

Language 
The main language of the city is Hiligaynon. Tagalog, Ilocano and Cebuano are also widely spoken. While Maguindanao, Maranao, English, and Arabic are also heard in the city.

Religion
Churches and Mosques in Koronadal:

Economy

Retail and commercial

Home for many shopping malls in South Cotabato, it serves as one of the tourism economic activity of the city. Koronadal is considered as the main shopping hub for nearby municipalities and provinces.

Government
Koronadal became a city on October 8, 2000. Since then the City Government of Koronadal has been in charge of the political, socio-cultural and economic development of the city.

Incumbent Officials:
Mayor:  Eliordo Ogena (Since 2019–present)
Vice Mayor:  Peter B. Miguel (Since 2019–present)

List of Mayors:
 Hilario De Pedro Sr. (1954 - 1960)
 Arturo Rojas Sr. (1960 - 1969)
 Gerardo Calaliman (1969 - 1980)
 Ismael Sueno (1980 - 1986)
 Hilario De Pedro III (1986 - 1988)
 Fernando Quirao Miguel (1988 - 1998)
 Vicente De Jesus (1998 - 2001) *First City Mayor
 Fernando Quirao Miguel (2001 - 2010)
 Peter B. Miguel (2010 - 2019)
 Eliordo Ogena (2019–present)

Culture

B’laan culture

The B'laan people are one of the indigenous peoples of the Southern Philippine island of Mindanao. Another tribe called the Maguindanao also inhabits the same area. The two tribes consider themselves to be brothers and sisters. Long ago, an Arab male (ancestral brother) married a B'laan female (ancestral sister) and through this marriage union, Islam infiltrated Southern Mindanao so that when the Spaniards arrived, their attempts to establish Catholicism were unsuccessful in the south. Eventually the B'laan and the Maguindanao became trade partners with the B'laan settling in the mountains and the Maguindanao settling along the coastal areas. From that time until now, the B'laans have been producing rice, vegetables, livestock, and rainforest products. The original religion of the Blaan is Animist. Presently, only 5% of the 8,000 B'laan tribal people are considered to be evangelical.

Catholic culture

The Catholic Filipinos make up the great majority (over 70%) of the Southern Philippine population. They are relatively newcomers to the area; the first wave of Christian migrants came in the seventeenth century when the Spaniards sought to populate Zamboanga, Jolo, Dapitan and other areas by encouraging people from Luzon and the Visayas to settle there. In the nineteenth century Spanish policy found considerable success in encouraging migrations to Iligan and Cotabato.

The Americans continued this pattern during their colonial administration. In 1913 the American colonial government provided resources for the establishment of agricultural colonies in Mindanao. By the time the Philippine Commonwealth was established, Mindanao had become a veritable frontier. Wave upon wave of migrants poured into the region, chiefly among them the Hiligaynons, Cebuanos, Ilocanos, and Kapampangans. These people did much to clear the virgin areas of Mindanao and open them to extensive agriculture and industry.

Muslim culture

The cultural diversity of the region is the result of a large influx of migrants from the north over a long period of the region's history. Found here are three main cultural groups: the early Filipinos who belong to various indigenous tribes living in the highlands and remote areas of Mindanao, the Maguindanaons who were early converts to Islam and who regard the region as their traditional homeland in the historical Sultanate of Maguindanao, and the Catholic Filipinos who founded settlements and communities in the course of their migrations from other parts of the country.

Events
Koronadal also hosted an international activity called Pyesta Kalon Datal: Koronadal International Folkloric Festival in coordination with Conseil international des organisations de festivals de folklore et d'arts traditionnels or the International Council of Organizations of Folklore Festivals and Folk Art (CIOFF) last August 10 to 18, 2015 and August 11 to 18, 2018 and several national activities such as the Palarong Pambansa in 1996 with General Santos and solo in 2007, Mindanao Business Forum, and National Schools Press Conference. On June 12, 2009, President Gloria Macapagal Arroyo together with Defense Secretary Gibo Teodoro celebrated the 111th Independence Day in the city, which marks a significant and historic event in the history of Koronadal.

Festivals

Hinugyaw Festival (January 8–10) – is the festival that marks the foundation anniversary of Koronadal as a municipality. It shows the festive spirit of the people of Koronadal with street dancing and night beer parties in the streets of Koronadal among other worthwhile activities.
T'nalak Festival (July 16–18) – a festival that celebrates South Cotabato's Tboli tribe with colorful abaca cloth created and woven by the women from their tribe. It symbolizes the blending of culture, strength and unity of the various ethnic groups living in the province. They have Dayana Civic Parade which highlighted by a float and cheer dance competition. They perform on the streets of the city showcasing native costumes of Blaan, Tboli and other tribal groups in Mindanao.
Cityhood Charter Anniversary (October 8) – celebrates the cityhood of Koronadal highlighted by "Negosyo Festival" showcasing the vibrancy of business and other economic enterprises in the City of Koronadal; consumers enjoy month-long citywide grand sale as participating business establishments give discounts of up to 70% off their regular prices on goods or services.

Tourism

Bong Gumne de Muhon
Damweng Dmatal
El Gawel Zoo
Mambucal Hot Spring
Saravia Falls
Siok Falls
Supon Falls

Parks:
CIOFF Park
Freedom Park
Paraiso Verde Water Park
Rizal Park

Museums and shrines:
Albert Morrow and Santiago Odi Memorial Shrine
Filipino – Japanese Memorial Shrine
General Paulino Santos Roundball
Historical Marker of the Seventeen Martyrs
Notre Dame of Marbel University Library and Museum
South Cotabato Community Museum
Tantoco Memorial Showcase

Healthcare
Health Facilities in Koronadal are also widely distributed to all Marbeleños.

Hospitals in the City of Koronadal:
South Cotabato Provincial Hospital, Aguinaldo Street
Allah Valley Medical Specialists’ Center, General Santos Drive
Dr. Arturo P. Pingoy Medical Center, General Santos Drive
Socomedics Medical Center, Judge Alba Street

Education

Education in Koronadal is widely distributed to all Koronadaleños. As for the school year 2009–2010, there are 95 primary and elementary schools in the city, both in public and private schools; while there are 17 secondary schools, both in public and private schools.

There are two universities in the city:
Notre Dame of Marbel University
University of the Philippines Manila – Koronadal School of Health Sciences

Other colleges are also vibrant in the education business. The list below shows the tertiary level schools present in the city:

The list below shows some prominent secondary and elementary schools present in the city:

Koronadal is also home to one seminary, the Our Lady of Perpetual Help Seminary or locally known as OLPHS.

Transportation

Land
Popular mode of public transportation in the city are the tricycles which was divided in 2021 into 4 cluster routes:
Red cluster (Northern Barangays)
Avanceña
Caloocan
part of General Paulino Santos
part of Morales
San Jose
Zone 1
Yellow cluster (Eastern Barangays)
Cacub
Concepcion
Esperanza
General Paulino Santos
Mabini
Magsaysay
New Pangasinan
Rotonda
San Roque
Santo Niño
Topland
Zone 2
Green cluster (Southern Barangays)
Assumption
Carpenter Hill
Mambucal
Santa Cruz
San Isidro
Saravia
Zone 3
Blue cluster (Western Barangays)
Morales
Paraiso
Zone 4

In accordance with the Public Utility Vehicle Modernization Program of the Philippine government, the government of Koronadal launched on 2022 the 10 routes that will serve the city:
Route 1: San Jose - Public Market Terminal
Route 2: Saravia - Public Market Terminal
Route 3: Topland - Public Market Terminal
Route 4: San Roque - Public Market Terminal
Route 5: Paraiso - Public Market Terminal
Route 6: San Isidro - Downtown loop (CW & CCW)
Route 7: Morales - Downtown
Route 8: Downtown loop 1 (CW & CCW)
Route 9: Downtown loop 2 (CW & CCW)
Tampakan - Downtown

Air
The nearest airport that serve Koronadal City is the General Santos International Airport in General Santos City. Alternative airports like the Francisco Bangoy International Airport in Davao City and the Cotabato Airport in Cotabato City are also accessible.

Sea
The nearest seaport that serve Koronadal is the Makar Wharf in General Santos City. Alternative seaports like the Sasa Port in Davao City is also accessible.

Notable personalities

Christian Perez - darts player
Jason Sabio - footballer who plays for Kaya
Kenneth Duremdes - PBA basketball player
Ernestine Tiamzon - DLSU Lady Spiker
Lovely Abella - GMA 7 Artist

Sister cities
 Valenzuela
 Iloilo City
 Ozamiz
 Cotabato City
 Pagadian
 Mandaluyong

References

External links

 
 Koronadal Profile at the DTI Cities and Municipalities Competitive Index
 KoronadalSite "Taga Koronadal Ako Ya"
 City Travel Guide
 [ Philippine Standard Geographic Code]

 
Cities in South Cotabato
Provincial capitals of the Philippines
Planned cities in the Philippines
Populated places established in 1947
1947 establishments in the Philippines
Component cities in the Philippines
Establishments by Philippine executive order